Tristan Daine Plummer (born 30 January 1990) is an English professional footballer who plays for Bitton. He is the younger brother of Dwayne Plummer.

Career
Born in Bristol, Plummer began his career as a trainee with Bristol City and while a trainee was linked with a move to Arsenal. However, reports that Arsenal were attempting to sign Plummer were ruled out by Bristol City chairman Stephen Lansdown in December 2006. Plummer turned professional in January 2007, but failed to break into the City first team. He joined League Two side Luton Town on loan in August 2008. He made his debut in a 3–1 defeat to Port Vale on 9 August 2008. He then joined Torquay United on loan on 2 January 2009 for the remainder of the 2008–09 season, but played just once before ending his loan early, after one month.

Plummer joined League Two side Hereford United on an initial one-month loan on 21 August 2009, alongside his clubmate and fellow young striker Marlon Jackson.

On 21 January 2010 he joined Gillingham on loan for a month, making two appearances.

After dropping out of professional football for a season, Plummer joined Portimonense S.C. of the Portuguese second division in July 2011. On 14 August 2011, Plummer scored the winning goal in a Portuguese league cup match against Freamunde, winning the game 3–2.

During pre-season Tristan had a trial with 2.Bundesliga side DSC Arminia Bielefeld which was ultimately unsuccessful. He subsequently signed with the Conference South team Weston-super-Mare.

Plummer ended his short spell with the South-West side to join Conference Premier side Aldershot Town in the January transfer window of 2014. He netted three goals in the latter half of the season before rejoining Weston-super-Mare for the 2015/16 season. In January 2016, Plummer scored an 89th-minute equaliser in a 5–5 draw with Hemel Hempstead Town in the Conference South. Plummer scored in three consecutive games, helping the Seagulls in their late fight for survival, eventually finishing 16th.

On 7 August 2016, Plummer signed for Southern League South and West side Hereford.

Bitton announced on 22 July 2019, that Plummer had joined the club.

Career statistics

References

External links
 

1990 births
Living people
Footballers from Bristol
English footballers
England youth international footballers
Association football forwards
Bristol City F.C. players
Luton Town F.C. players
Torquay United F.C. players
Hereford United F.C. players
Gillingham F.C. players
Portimonense S.C. players
Weston-super-Mare A.F.C. players
Aldershot Town F.C. players
Weymouth F.C. players
Hereford F.C. players
Frome Town F.C. players
Bitton A.F.C. players
English Football League players
National League (English football) players